Mbube may refer to:
 "Mbube" (song), a Zulu song composed by Solomon Linda
 Mbube (genre), a South African singing style named after the song
 Booster Mbube, a character in the Speed Racer film adaptation